"Weaponry" is a song by American singer Mike Posner, and vocals by British singer Jessie J. The melody of the song is entirely based on Mike's previously released song, "A Lover and a Memory", from Steve Aoki's album Neon Future III (2018).

Written by Posner, Tom Barnes, Pete Kelleher, Ben Kohn, and Steve Aoki the song was released by Island Records on December 18, 2020, as the lead single from Posner's fourth solo studio album, Operation: Wake Up (2020).

Writing
"Weaponry" is a reworking of the song "A Lover and a Memory", from Steve Aoki's 2018 album Neon Future III.

Content
Mike Wass, writing for Idolator, described the song as a "deeply emotional mid-tempo ballad."

Within the context of Operation: Wake Up, the song is proceeded by "Once In A While (Mike Meets Jessie J)."

Music video
The music video was released on YouTube on December 18, 2020, and directed by Eric Maldin. The video shows that a woman played by American actress Stephanie Pearson tearfully stares at Posner painfully shaving his own hair with a hair trimmer in a white-painted room, cutting himself several times in the process. As of June 2022, the video has been viewed over 1,000,000 times.

Charts

References

2020 singles
2020 songs
Jessie J songs
Mike Posner songs